State Route 275 (SR 275) is a  long east-west state highway in eastern Lincoln County, Tennessee, connecting Park City with Flintville via Lincoln and Vanntown. Despite its east-west designation, it runs almost entirely north-south between Vanntown and US 64.

Route description

SR 275 begins in Park City at an intersection with US 231/US 431 (SR 10). It heads east as Lincoln Road through farmland and rural areas to pass through the community of Lincoln. The highway then becomes Vanntown Road as it crosses a bridge over the Flint River and continue east through rural areas to the Vanntown community, where it turns north along N Vanntown School Road. SR 275 leaves Vanntown and turns northeast along Oliver Smith Road to cross over the  Flint River again to pass through the community of Flintville. It turns north again along Flintville Road to pass through rural areas before coming to an end at an intersection with US 64 (SR 15). The entire route of SR 275 is a two-lane highway.

Major intersections

References

275
Transportation in Lincoln County, Tennessee